Sampaloc is a district of Manila, Philippines. It is referred to as the University Belt or simply called “U-Belt” for numerous colleges and universities are found within the district such as the University of Santo Tomas, the oldest extant university in Asia; the National University, the first private nonsectarian and coeducational institution in the Philippines; the Far Eastern University, known for its Art Deco campus and cultural heritage site of the Philippines; and the University of the East, once dubbed as the largest university in Asia in terms of enrollment. The district is bordered by the districts of Quiapo and San Miguel in the south, Santa Mesa district in the south and east, Santa Cruz district in the west and north, and Quezon City in the northeast.

Aside from being the "University Belt", Sampaloc is also known to Metro Manila and the surrounding provinces for its Dangwa flower market, located in Dimasalang Road, well known as the selling center for cut flowers from all over the Philippines, mainly Baguio. Sampaloc is also the location of a former colonial mansion, now called Windsor Inn, which is popular among backpackers and budget travelers.

Barangays 395 to 636 of the City of Manila would all have belonged to Sampaloc and comprise 241 barangays for the district. However, what are now known as barangays 587-636 became part of Santa Mesa when these areas were separated from Sampaloc after Santa Mesa became a separate parish in 1911. Santa Mesa is now a part of the 6th congressional district of Manila, while Sampaloc is the sole district comprising the 4th congressional district of Manila.

Many streets in Sampaloc, particularly in the northeast portion divided by España and Lacson Avenues, have names that are directly associated with the Philippine national hero José Rizal, either named after the places (e.g. Calamba, Dapitan), real-life people (e.g. Blumentritt), characters from his novels (e.g. Ibarra, Maria Clara) or his pen names (e.g. Laong Laan, Dimasalang).

Barangays

Etymology
"Sampaloc" or "Sampalok" is the native Tagalog word for the tamarind fruit. The place was likely named after it due to tamarind trees that may have been rampant in the area.

History

The founding of Sampaloc as a town coincided with its establishment as a parish independent of Santa Ana de Sapa in 1613. At the time, it included what is now Pandacan which was separated from it in 1712. Sampaloc would comprise ten barrios ― Bacood, Balic-Balic, Bilarang Hipon, Calubcub, Manggahan, Nagtahan, San Isidro, San Roque, Santa Mesa, and Santol.

Outbreak of the Philippine-American War

Following the Philippine Revolution against Spain and the Treaty of Paris of 1898 which seceded the Philippines to the United States, the subsequent arrival of American colonial troops shortly drew animosity between both American troops and Filipino troops. 

When a detachment of Philippine Revolutionary Army troops attempted to cross the San Juan River Bridge, American troops returned fire. This event was memorialized with a historical marker which had stood on the bridge until it was ordered to be moved in 2003 after studies by Dr. Benito J. Legarda concluded that the shot was not fired at the bridge, but was instead fired somewhere between Blockhouse 7 (within the city limits of Manila) and Barrio Santol at Silenco Street (now part of Sampaloc) on the connecting road that is now Sociego Street.

American colonial era
In 1901, with the chartering of the city of Manila under the American-led Taft Commission, where most of Sampaloc, with the exception of the barrio of Bilarang Hipon, would be absorbed by the city of Manila when its borders were extended outside the walled city now known as Intramuros.

Contemporary period
In 1996, Ramon Bagatsing Jr., the then-representative of Manila's 4th district, launched a program called the "Sampaloc Experiment", which sought to implement the then-new subject of computer education within the district's public schools as a trial program for the rest of the country.

Education

Education in Sampaloc is handled by the Division of City Schools – Manila. Sampaloc is also home to some universities and colleges part of the University Belt such as Far Eastern University, Informatics, Mary Chiles College, National University, Perpetual Help College of Manila, Philippine College of Health Sciences, Philippine School of Business Administration, University of the East, University of Manila, and University of Santo Tomas.

Transportation

Sampaloc is the hub of major national bus transportation carriers. Among the bus companies in Sampaloc with their terminal are: Fariñas Transit Company, GV Florida Transport, Victory Liner, Partas, Maria De Leon, RCJ Trans, RCJ Lines, Five Star Bus Company, Northern Luzon Bus Line and Dalin liner and other southern Luzon buses.

Sampaloc is served by two Philippine National Railways station: Laon Laan and España station. It is also served by LRT Line 2 Legarda station and LRT Line 1 Blumentritt Station in Santa Cruz.

Main thoroughfares in Sampaloc are S.H. Loyola (formerly Lepanto), Vicente Cruz, M. De La Fuente, P. Florentino, Blumentritt, Aurora Boulevard, Dapitan, Laon Laan, Dimasalang, Maria Clara, Maceda, Padre Campa, Padre Noval, Tomas Earnshaw (Bustillos), Legarda, Gastambide, Recto Avenue, Lerma, Nicanor Reyes (Morayta), Lacson Avenue and España Boulevard.

See also
University Belt

References

 
Districts of Manila